Virbia aurantiaca, the orange holomelina, is a moth species of the  family Erebidae found in North America. In the east it has been recorded from Manitoba and Nova Scotia, south along the eastern seaboard to Cordoba in Mexico. It has also been recorded from Texas, Mississippi, Missouri, Tennessee, Louisiana, Oklahoma, Kansas, North Dakota and South Dakota.

The length of the forewings is about 10 mm for males and 9.7 mm for females. The male forewings range from clay to cinnamon. The hindwings are peach red with a raw umber subterminal band. The female forewings range from salmon to cinnamon with a faint olive brown discal spot. The hindwings are peach red with a brown discal spot and brown subterminal markings.

Larvae have been reared on dandelion and plantain species.

References

Moths of North America
aurantiaca
Moths described in 1831